The 2017 Miami mayoral election took place on November 7, 2017, to elect the Mayor of Miami, Florida. The election was officially nonpartisan. A runoff election would have taken place on November 21, 2017, if no candidate had received a majority of votes in the general election. Francis X. Suarez won the election with almost 86% of the vote and little opposition, thus avoiding the runoff.

Candidates

Declared
 William Armbrister Sr., businessman (Independent)
 Christian Canache, businessman (Independent)
 Robert Ingram Burke, former candidate for Florida's 24th congressional district (Independent)
 Francis X. Suarez, Miami City Commissioner (Republican Party), endorsed by U.S. Senator Marco Rubio

Declined
 Frank Carallo, Miami City Commissioner (Republican Party)
 Billy Corben, documentary film director and co-founder of the Miami-based studio Rakontur (Independent)

Results
 Francis X. Suarez – 21,852 votes (85.83%)
 William Armbrister Sr. – 1,390 votes (5.46%)
 Cynthia Jaquith – 1,390 votes (5.46%)
 Christian Canache – 829 votes (3.25%)

References

Mayoral election, 2017
Miami
2017
Miami
Miami